was a Japanese Nippon Professional Baseball player. He played for the Yakult Swallows and Nippon-Ham Fighters.

External links

1957 births
Living people
People from Narashino
Baseball people from Chiba Prefecture
Chuo University alumni
Japanese baseball players
Nippon Professional Baseball outfielders
Yakult Swallows players
Nippon Ham Fighters players
Managers of baseball teams in Japan
Tokyo Yakult Swallows managers